Brian Shoop is an American baseball former coach and player. He played college baseball at Malone University from 1977 to 1980. He then served as the head baseball coach of the Birmingham–Southern Panthers (1990–2006) and the UAB Blazers (2007–2020)

Playing career
Shoop attended Malone University and played baseball for the Pioneers all four years.  He was an all-district selection, and the team was Ohio NAIA champion each year.

Coaching career
After finishing his playing career, Shoop became an assistant coach at his alma mater while completing a master's degree at nearby Kent State University.  The Pioneers continued their streak of Ohio NAIA championships both years that Shoop was on the staff.  He then became an assistant at Southeastern Conference power Mississippi State for seven years.  In Starkville, Shoop worked with future Major League Baseball stars Will Clark and Rafael Palmeiro, among others.  After his time with the Bulldogs, Shoop became head coach at Birmingham–Southern, leading that program for seventeen seasons.  He amassed 692 wins, and led the team during most of its brief time at the Division I level.  Under Shoop, the Panthers claimed a pair of Big South Conference titles and appeared in the Athens Regional.  In their last year as an NAIA school, BSC won their first national championship after winning a school record 55 games.

After BSC decided to move their programs to Division III, Shoop accepted the head coach position across Birmingham at UAB.  In six seasons with the Blazers, Shoop has coached 19 all-conference players and ten future professional players. After finishing in 2nd place in C-USA, Brian Shoop received the C-USA  Head Coach of the Year award for 2014.

Shoop won his 800th game on May 14, 2010 with a victory over Tulane and his 900th on Feb. 22, 2014, with a 4–0 win over Youngstown State. On May 10, 2020, Shoop announced his retirement from coaching.

Head coaching record
The following is a table of Shoop's head coaching records in NCAA competition.  Although Shoop was the head coach of Birmingham–Southern from 1990–2006, the program did not join the NCAA until the start of the 2002 season.

References

Living people
Baseball players from Columbus, Ohio
Baseball coaches from Ohio
Malone Pioneers baseball players
Malone Pioneers baseball coaches
Kent State University alumni
Mississippi State Bulldogs baseball coaches
Birmingham–Southern Panthers baseball coaches
UAB Blazers baseball coaches
Year of birth missing (living people)